Pallavi Dey (23 February 1997 – 15 May 2022), also known as Pallabi Dey, was an Indian actress, who worked in the Bengali film industry. She started her career with the Bengali serial Resham Jhanpi. She is best known for the serial Ami Sirajer Begum.

Career
Dey started her career with the serial Resham Jhanpi. In 2018, she was given the role of Lutfa in the serial Ami Sirajer Begum. Other work by Dey included Kunjochaya, Saraswatir Prem, and Mon Mane Na.

Death
Dey died on 15 May 2022. According to The Times of India, she was found hanging from a ceiling fan and rushed to Bangur Hospital, where she was declared dead. Her death was initially said to be suicide.  Dey lived with her partner Sagnik Chakroborty, and he informed the police that she had died. Dey's father, Nilu Dey, told the police that he believed that Chakroborty and another woman had murdered Dey.  Garfa Police arrested Chakroborty on 17 May 2022 after a long interrogation.

Chakroborty is married, but had filed a petition for divorce, and had been living with Dey since then.

Television

References

External links 
 

2022 deaths
People from Howrah
Indian film actresses
21st-century Indian actresses
Actresses in Bengali cinema
Bengali actresses
1997 births